Acacia wilcoxii is a shrub of the genus Acacia and the subgenus Phyllodineae. It is native to an area in the Mid West and Goldfields-Esperance regions of Western Australia.

It blooms from August to September and produces yellow flowers.

See also
 List of Acacia species

References

wilcoxii
Acacias of Western Australia
Taxa named by Bruce Maslin